The following is a list of Southern Ndebele people.

Kings, chiefs, princes and princess

Ingwenyama Mayitjha II
Senteni Masango

Academics
Ntongela Masilela
Busisiwe Mkhwebane

Militants
Solomon Mahlangu
Davidson Masuku

Religious
Moses Mahlangu

Politicians and activities
Bongani Bongo
David Mabuza
Fish Mahlalela
Dikeledi Mahlangu
Gwen Mahlangu-Nkabinde
M. J. Mahlangu
Ndaweni Mahlangu
Norah Mahlangu
Qedani Mahlangu
Solomon Mahlangu
David Mahlobo
Bonakele Majuba
Mduduzi Manana
James Masango
Makhosazane Masilela
Bandile Masuku
Madala Masuku
Refilwe Mtsweni-Tsipane
Pat Ngomane
Lindiwe Ntshalintshali
Busisiwe Shiba
Gert Sibande
Gijimani Skosana
James Jim Skosana
Maki Skosana

Artists, actors and writers
Nomuzi Mabena
Esther Mahlangu
Moses Mahlangu
Bongani Masuku
Thulani Mtsweni
Vincent Mahlangu
Gerard Sekoto

Athletes
Happy Jele
Ndumiso Mabena
Innocent Maela
 Iqraam Rayners
Bongani Mahlangu
Bongani Mahlangu (cricketer)
Duncan Mahlangu
Jabu Mahlangu
July Mahlangu
May Mahlangu
Ntando Mahlangu
Sibusiso Mahlangu
Victor Mahlangu
Mandla Masango
Tsepo Masilela
Khethokwakhe Masuku
Menzi Masuku
Thabo Mamojele
Dumisa Ngobe
 Jamie Webber
Jerry Sikhosana
Brian Skosana
Lwazi Skosana
Josia Thugwane
Nothando Vilakazi
 Lyle Foster
 Luke Fleurs

Criminals
Chris Mahlangu

See also
List of Xhosa people
List of South Africans
List of Zulu people
List of South African office-holders
Southern Ndebele people

Southern Ndebele people